

The global headquarters for Novus International is located in St. Louis, Missouri, in the US. The building was completed in 2009 in a design-and-build partnership with Clayco, resulting in a 90,000 square foot complex with a Platinum LEED (Leadership in Energy and Environmental Design) certification (a green building certification program). Prior to the new construction, Novus had two facilities in St. Louis, located 12 miles apart; one was the administration building and the other was the research lab.

In order to achieve Platinum LEED certification, a building must demonstrate eligibility on multiple criteria, including energy savings, water efficiency,  emissions reduction, improved indoor environmental quality, and stewardship of resources and sensitivity to their impacts. Novus International partnered with the Lamar Johnson Collaborative on the project. Features of the Novus International global headquarters facility which contribute to the achievement of Platinum LEED certification include:

Electricity
 The second largest array of solar panels in Missouri (5,000 square feet). 	
 Three percent of the building’s electricity comes from the 35-kilowatt photovoltaic panels. They provide 44,835 kilowatt hours of energy annually.  	
 Replaced all of the outdated and inefficient fluorescent light fixtures with new, more efficient models.  	
 Fitted with floor-to-ceiling windows and skylights in order to take advantage of the natural day lighting.  	
 Certificates have been purchased for 100% electricity from renewable wind sources on the Blue Grass Wind Farm in northwest Missouri and a wind farm in Texas.

Recycling
 98% of the original building was reused, including walls, doors, and flooring.  	
 98.4% percent of the on-site construction waste was diverted from landfills and recycled.  	
 Masonry was sent to an aggregate recycler. When it returned, it was reused on the site as fill under the parking lots.  	
 Drywall waste was ground up and used as soft material in the sculpted landscaping soil surfaces.  	
 Metal was sent to a metals recycler and wood went to a composter in St. Louis.   
 Cardboard, plastics, and paper all were recycled in traditional methods.  	
 All of the old lighting fixtures, including the lamps and the ballasts, were sent to recyclers.  	
 One paper recycling container is available at every workstation, and in copy rooms, lab offices, and the mail room.
 Glass, metal, and plastic recycling containers are located at coffee stations adjacent to men’s and women’s changing rooms.  	
 Cardboard recycling stations are located by the loading dock and in the mail room.  	
 10% of the total materials cost came from salvaged materials. Novus purchased a large shipment of salvaged raised flooring from an old computer center. 	
 31% of the total materials cost came from recycled content. Examples include countertops made from recycled milk jugs and scrap aluminum, fitness room floor made from recycled tires, and carpet containing recycled yarn.

Landscaping
 The landscaping was designed to restore 53.4% of the area to its original, natural Missouri habitat.
 Landscaped using Missouri native grasses and plants such as grasses, sedums, and low ground cover designed to require no irrigation, equating to thousands of gallons of water saved each year.
 A storm water system that will greatly reduce the environmental impact of runoff and improve water quality to receiving streams and eventually the Missouri River. More specifically, the addition of vegetated bioswales that divert stormwater from the municipal wastewater system.

Other
 The HVAC was installed as an efficient under-floor air distribution system with controls at individual workstations. 
 In the restrooms, exchanging all the older 3.5-gallon (13.2-L) toilets with dual-flush 1.6-gallon (6.1-L) tanks reduced the quantity of sanitary wastewater by 50 percent. In addition, urinals and lavatories were replaced with low-flow fixtures.
 Preferred parking for numerous employees who drive low-emitting or fuel efficient vehicles that have scored above a 40 on the scoring system on the greenercars.org website.<ref>

Materials used
 3Form 100 percent – Surface material made from recycled milk jugs and is used on countertops in the reception area. 	
 Alkemi – Surface material made from recycled scrap aluminum and is used on a desk in the reception area. 	
 IceStone – Surface material containing recycled glass is used in the reception area and the coffee bar. 	
 PaperStone – surface material made from recycled paper and used for countertops at the coffee bar.  	
 Bamboo – Fastest growing hardwood in the world and is used on many of the wood surfaces in the building including doors and cabinets. 	
 Wheat board – Engineered from straw fibers and was used instead of plywood. 	
 Linoleum – Plant-based material made from linseed oil and pine resin and used in flooring.
 Cumaru – The Forest Stewardship Council standards ensure that this wood is harvested in a responsible fashion. The FSC-certified Brazilian hardwood is used in the reception area and accounted for 66.76% of new wood-based costs.

References

Leadership in Energy and Environmental Design platinum certified buildings
Sustainable buildings in the United States
Buildings and structures in Missouri